The 2011 Ohio Bobcats football team represented Ohio University in the 2011 NCAA Division I FBS football season. The Bobcats were led by seventh-year head coach Frank Solich and played their home games at Peden Stadium. They were a member of the East Division of the Mid-American Conference (MAC). Ohio finished the season 10–4, 6–2 in MAC play to be champions of the East Division. They represented the division in the MAC Championship Game where they lost to Northern Illinois. They were invited to the Famous Idaho Potato Bowl where they defeated Utah State for their first bowl victory in school history.

Schedule

References

Ohio
Ohio Bobcats football seasons
Famous Idaho Potato Bowl champion seasons
Ohio Bobcats football